Paolo Lorenzi and Júlio Silva were the defending champions. They didn't take part in these championships this year.
Stefano Ianni and Cristian Villagrán won in the final 7–6(7–3), 1–6, [10–6], against Niels Desein and Stéphane Robert.

Seeds

Draw

Draw

References
 Doubles Draw

Carisap Tennis Cup - Doubles
ATP Challenger San Benedetto